Harry MacDonald may refer to:
Harry MacDonald (racing driver) (born 1940), retired American racecar driver
Harry MacDonald (cricketer) (1861–1936), English cricketer

See also
Harry McDonald (disambiguation)
Henry MacDonald (1823–1893), Scottish recipient of the Victoria Cross
Harold MacDonald (disambiguation)